Amphisbaena anaemariae is a worm lizard species in the family Amphisbaenidae. It is endemic to Brazil.

References

anaemariae
Reptiles described in 1997
Endemic fauna of Brazil
Reptiles of Brazil
Taxa named by Paulo Vanzolini